Jeffree Star (born Jeffrey Lynn Steininger Jr., November 15, 1985) is an American YouTuber, makeup artist, and former singer-songwriter. He is the founder and owner of Jeffree Star Cosmetics.

In 2009, Star released a studio album, Beauty Killer, which included songs such as "Lollipop Luxury" featuring Nicki Minaj. He embarked on several world tours to promote his music. In 2010, he signed to Konvict Muzik but abruptly left the music industry by 2013 citing legal issues the label’s owner faced between 2007 and 2010. In November 2014, Star founded the company Jeffree Star Cosmetics. In 2018, Forbes revealed that he had earned $18 million from his YouTube endeavors alone, making him the fifth-highest-paid YouTuber that year.

Early life
Jeffree Lynn Steininger Jr. was born in Los Angeles County, California, on November 15, 1985 and grew up in Orange County, California. He says that he began experimenting with his mother's makeup as a child, and convinced her to let him wear it to school when he was in junior high. Star attended Pacifica High School in Garden Grove, California, from which he graduated in 2002. After high school, he legally changed his name to Jeffree Star and supported himself with various makeup, modeling, and music jobs in Los Angeles. He recalls his early years, spending his weekends using a fake ID to attend Hollywood clubs, which is where celebrities would hire him as a personal makeup artist.

Career

MySpace
Star used MySpace to further both his music as well as fashion design career. Using MySpace like a blog, Star shared his personal life, while also providing social commentary on "self-image and confidence", fame and beauty. Due to his use of several websites, Star already had a built-up fan base who signed up to join him on MySpace, giving his profile a large number of friends from its inception. His MySpace photoshoots would frequently gain over 50,000 comments. He also gained fame as one of the most popular independent artists, with the daily rankings placing him in the top tier on MySpace.

Music career
Star's career as an electronica and pop vocalist began when he befriended Peaches' drummer Samantha Maloney, who encouraged him to make music. During the summer of 2007, he was advertised as a part of the True Colors Tour 2007, which traveled through 15 cities in the United States and Canada. The tour, sponsored by the LGBT Logo channel, began on June 8, 2007, to coincide with Pride month.

Star released his first and only studio album Beauty Killer in 2009, which peaked at number seven on the US Billboard Top Electronic Albums chart. The album included songs such as "Lollipop Luxury" featuring Nicki Minaj. He embarked on several world tours to promote his music. In 2010, he signed to Konvict Muzik—whose founder Akon described Star as "the next Lady Gaga"—with plans to release a second album. However, it was never released and Star abruptly left the music industry in 2013 under unclear circumstances. He later described signing to Akon's record label as "the biggest mistake I've ever made."

He appeared in the second version of Kesha's music video for her single "Take It Off" in 2010. Star has worked with several other musical performers, including Blood on the Dance Floor, Deuce, Millionaires, and Larry Tee.

Conflicts with other media personalities 
Star's quarrels with other media personalities include conversations with tattoo artist Kat Von D, who accused Star of "drug use, racism, and bullying"; Tati Westbrook, who accused Star and Shane Dawson of forcing her to upload a video attacking fellow beauty YouTuber James Charles, whose brother, Ian Jeffrey, was also bullied by Star on Twitter; Kylie Jenner, whose products were criticized by Star; Kim Kardashian; and Jerrod Blandino, co-founder of Too Faced Cosmetics.

In 2010, Star called Blood on the Dance Floor member Dahvie Vanity, who was arrested in 2009 on sexual assault charges, a "child fucker", tweeting that he saw Vanity "bring underage girls to his hotel room [...] 100% ILLEGAL". Star had said he had witnessed Vanity's actions in 2012. Other tweets show Star telling people to "get over the negativity" against Vanity, and promoting a Blood on the Dance Floor album. He was accused of associating with Vanity despite knowing about sexual assault allegations to profit off Vanity's continued success. Following a HuffPost report detailing sexual assault – before and after 2010 – against 21 individuals (many of whom were minors), Chris Hansen of To Catch a Predator started covering the story. Speaking to Hansen on YouTube, Star said he had no knowledge of any inappropriate activity between Vanity and underage girls while they worked together, and that his tweets were based on hearsay.

Jeffree Star Cosmetics

In 2014, Star founded his e-commerce makeup brand, Jeffree Star Cosmetics. In a five-part docuseries by Shane Dawson, Star stated that the end of his music career had left him essentially bankrupt, and that he had used his remaining savings to start his makeup brand. Star began promoting the brand through videos published on YouTube, leading to the success of his YouTube channel, with 17.4 million subscribers and over 2.4 billion views as of October 2020. Bustle magazine described Star as "a musician and onetime MySpace celeb that reinvented himself in the YouTube makeup tutorial space." His first cosmetics release was a collection of velour liquid lipsticks, which were followed by highlighter palettes, lip scrubs, eyeshadow palettes, clothing, and accessories, such as mirrors and make up bags. The first East Coast location to carry the cosmetics line was a Morphe Cosmetics store at the Westfield Garden State Plaza in Paramus, New Jersey on August 11, 2018. Star has since launched several successful collections, such as the "Blue Blood" eyeshadow palette.

Personal life 
Star was in a relationship with Nathan Schwandt from 2015 to January 2020. Star claims to abstain from alcohol, despite previously tweeting about drinking vodka on multiple occasions. He also says that he avoids cigarettes and hard drugs, although he does smoke cannabis.

As of December 2020, Star resides in Casper, Wyoming.
Following a car accident in Wyoming on April 16, 2021, Star and his friend were both hospitalized. He broke his back and had several fractures on his spine.

Controversies

Star was accused of racism due to derogatory remarks about minorities. He later apologized for the remarks. A satirical skit between Star and a drag queen was posted on MySpace, in which Star allegedly states he wants to throw battery acid on a black woman to lighten her skin so it will match her foundation.

In June 2020, Star apologized after images and an archive of his former website Lipstick Nazi resurfaced. The website featured swastikas alongside photos of Star engaging in self-harm.

In an October 2020 report by journalist Kat Tenbarge, Star was accused of multiple instances of sexual assault, assault, and paying $10,000 in hush money to accusers. An attorney for Star denied all the allegations. Leaked documents later appeared to show one of Star's accusers being paid $45,000 by a Jeffree Star Cosmetics executive.

Filmography

Discography

Studio albums

Extended plays

Singles

Awards

References

External links

 

 
1985 births
Living people
21st-century American singers
American YouTubers
American bloggers
American electronic musicians
American fashion designers
American make-up artists
American male bloggers
American male singer-songwriters
American performance artists
American male pop singers
American synth-pop musicians
Beauty and makeup YouTubers
LGBT YouTubers
LGBT fashion designers
LGBT people from California
American LGBT rights activists
American LGBT singers
American LGBT songwriters
Male models from California
Singer-songwriters from California
Warner Music Group artists
American cosmetics businesspeople
YouTube vloggers
YouTube controversies
20th-century American LGBT people
21st-century American LGBT people